Cringe comedy is a subgenre of comedy that derives humor from social awkwardness, guilty pleasure, self-deprecation, idiosyncratic humor and personal distress. A type of a cringe comedy are pseudo-reality TV shows, sometimes with an air of a mockumentary. They revolve around a serious setting, such as a workplace, to lend the comedy a sense of reality.

Typically, the protagonists are egotists who overstep the boundaries of political correctness and break social norms. The comedy will attack the protagonist by not letting them become aware of their self-centered view, or by making them oblivious to the ego-deflation that the comedy deals them. Sometimes an unlikable protagonist may not suffer any consequences, which violates people's moral expectations, and also makes the audience cringe.

Theory
Humor theorist Noël Carroll explains this kind of humor in relation to incongruity theory and annoyance:  Imagine the cutlery laid out for a formal dinner. Suppose that the salad fork is in the wrong place. If you are the sort of person who is disturbed by such deviations from the norm, you will not be capable of finding this amusing. On the other hand, if you are more easy-going about such matters and also aware of the incongruity, it may elicit a chuckle. That is, you may find the error amusing or not. But if you find it genuinely amusing, you cannot find it annoying.

Examples
Notable examples of television programs in the genre of cringe comedy include:

 Crazy Ex-Girlfriend
 Curb Your Enthusiasm
 Da Ali G Show
 Extras
 Fleabag
 Girls
 I Think You Should Leave with Tim Robinson
 I'm Alan Partridge
 Impractical Jokers
 Louie
 Nathan for You
 Parks and Recreation
 Peep Show 
 People Just Do Nothing
 Review
 The Comeback
 The Inbetweeners
 The Larry Sanders Show
 The Last Man on Earth
 The Mindy Project
 The Office
 Veep

References

Comedy genres
Humour
Stand-up comedy